Mark Vincent Letheren (born 6 February 1971) is an English actor. He is best known for his roles as journalist Simon Kitson in ITV's drama The Bill, as Ben Harding in the BBC One drama Casualty and for his recurring role as DS Kevin Geoffries in Wire in the Blood.

Early life 
Letheren was born in Chelmsford, Essex. He attended Ardingly College and the Guildhall School of Music and Drama.

Career 
His large screen debut was in Restoration, with Robert Downey Jr. in 1995.

Television 
He has appeared in many television dramas, including Wire in the Blood, The Bill, Silent Witness, Casualty, Holby City, Waking The Dead, Heartbeat and A Touch of Frost.

Stage 
He has also performed on stage many times throughout his career. He played Jamie in the world premiere of Jonathan Harvey's Beautiful Thing, starred in Mark Healey's adaptation of John Fowles' The Collector, and toured the US with the Royal Shakespeare Company, as Francis Flute in A Midsummer Night's Dream. 
He played 'Bernie Dodd' in The Country Girl at the Apollo Theatre in 2010.
He also played the 'Stalker' in The Bodyguard (musical) at the Adelphi Theatre, between 2012 and 2014.
In 2014, he appeared in Lotty's War (written by Giuliano Crispini and directed by Bruce Guthrie) at the Yvonne Arnaud Theatre, Guildford, before it began touring the UK.

Personal life
Letheren lives in Bristol with his long-term partner, actress Georgia Taylor, whom he met on the set of Casualty.

Filmography

Films

TV

References

External links
 
 Mark Letheren's official website

1971 births
Living people
People educated at Ardingly College
Alumni of the Guildhall School of Music and Drama
Actors from Chelmsford
English male film actors
English male television actors
English male radio actors
Male actors from Essex
20th-century English male actors
21st-century English male actors